Silvio Savelli (died 1515) was an Italian condottiero. A member of the Savelli family of Rome, he was the brother of Troiano Savelli.

After the initial baronial struggles against the Colonna and the Orsini, he was hired by the Republic of Florence, taking part in the war for Pisa in 1503–1505. Later he was under the Holy Roman Empire's banner, and participated in the Battle of Novara.

In 1513 Massimiliano Sforza, Duke of Milan, entrusted him with a force of 2,700 infantry and 500 horses to capture Bergamo, which was held by the Venetians, and Savelli defeated Renzo da Ceri. Savelli was wounded when da Ceri defeated him at the battle of Ombriano near Crema, and Bergamo fell again to Venice. Savelli was able to regain the city and obtained the title of commander-in-chief of the Milanese infantry.

In 1515 he is mentioned for the last time, at the defence of Alessandria.

References

External links
Page at condottieridiventura.it 

16th-century condottieri
Silvio
15th-century births
1515 deaths